Newham Sixth Form College (NewVIc) is a sixth form college located in the East London borough of Newham. Situated on a single site in Plaistow, the college was established in 1992 to provide for students in Newham and neighbouring boroughs who opt to stay in education beyond GCSE O-levels. It is designed for students ages 16 to 19 and its curriculum includes A-levels as well as specialist pathway, levels 2 and 3 vocational, foundation level and ESOL programmes. There are currently about 2,500 students at the college.

History
A school was first opened on the site as the municipal Plaistow Secondary School in 1926.  In 1945 this became Plaistow Grammar School (later known as Plaistow County Grammar School) which in 1972 merged with Faraday Secondary Modern School to become Cumberland Comprehensive School.

After Cumberland moved and the borough of Newham adopted a sixth form re-organised education system, the Newham Sixth Form College was established and opened its doors to students in September 1992. Student numbers grew rapidly, increasing from 750 in the first year to over 2,000 in the 2002/3 academic year and more than 2,500 in 2009/10.

The college was led from 1991 to 2008 by Sid Hughes, who won a Lifetime Achievement Award in the Teaching Awards of 2005 and was awarded an honorary degree by University of East London upon his retiring from NewVIc.  Eddie Playfair served as principal from 2008 to end of Spring 2018. Mandeep Gill began as principal in 2018.

Curriculum
The college offers a range of A-levels, an Honours programme, specialist pathways, level 2 and 3 vocational programmes, as well as foundation, entry level and ESOL programmes.

Statistics
NewVIc sends more disadvantaged students to university than any other sixth-form provider in England. The college is also ranked by the Sutton Trust as being in the top 5% of high performing sixth forms in England, in progressing students from disadvantaged backgrounds to university.

Facilities
The college invested £6m in a new building on Prince Regent Lane, which includes a new reception, theatre and cafe.

Achievements
NewVIc’s Sports Academy is one of four London colleges that have been accredited with Sports Leadership status by national charity, Sports Leaders UK. The college was awarded £70,000 by Sport England FE Activation Fund for increasing capacity over three years, including a specific focus on disability provision and leadership. This has resulted in significant success for a number of sports including cricket.

In 2019, the college received its best ever results which saw more students achieving A* - B grades in A Levels and more than 50% of BTEC students achieving Triple Distinction* in Level 3 Extended Diplomas. It was also graded overall as ‘Good’ by Ofsted and recognised as ‘Outstanding’ for its provision of Personal Development, Welfare and Behaviour in January 2019.

Notable alumni
Roshonara Choudhry - Islamist convicted of the attempted murder of MP Stephen Timms in 2010.

References

External links
 

Sixth form colleges in London
Education in the London Borough of Newham
Educational institutions established in 1992
Plaistow, Newham
1992 establishments in England